Bucknam is a surname. Notable people with the surname include:

Frank W. Bucknam (1869–1942), American pharmacist
Olivia Dudley Bucknam (1874–1966), American civic leader
Ransford Dodsworth Bucknam (1869–1915), Canadian-born Turkish Army admiral
Thelma Darkings Bucknam (born c. 1960), Costa Rican actress and television presenter